Higher School of National Economy in Kutno (pol. Wyższa Szkoła Gospodarki Krajowej w Kutnie, abbreviated - WSGK w Kutnie) - higher education institution based in Kutno on the street Lelewel 7, almost in the center.

It offers in-person and distance education, postgraduate education and a wide range of courses.

The university has its own houses, dormitories, social facilities and sports grounds. It also has a library and its own publishing house - "Publishing WSGK"

There are international students’ programs, training, and excursions. The high school has its own hostels, sportive infrastructure, and libraries. Students have training in Poland and abroad.

Departments 
 Gardening
 Nursing (I stage)
 Nursing (II stage)
 Surveying and mapping (inż.)
 Geodesy and cartography (mgr)
 Engineering
 European studies (licencjat)
 European Studies (mgr)
 Management (its different areas optional)
 Computer science
 Special education
 Administration
 Tourism, hotel business
and other.

Links

References

Kutno
Universities in Poland